Achille Scognamillo, stage name Achille Millo (Naples, 25 October 1922 – Rome, 18 October 2006), was an Italian actor and stage director.

Selected filmography
The Models of Margutta (1946)
 Cab Number 13 (1948) 
 Terra senza tempo (1950)
 Immortal Melodies (1952)
 Lieutenant Giorgio (1952)
 Half a Century of Song (1952)
 Neapolitan Carousel (1954)

Voice recordings
 Italian version of "Barbara" poem by Jacques Prévert, music of Joseph Kosma with accordion Franco Scarica Fonit  Italy	1960

References

External links

1922 births
2006 deaths
Italian male film actors
Italian male television actors
20th-century Italian male actors
Male actors from Naples
Burials at the Cimitero Flaminio